A flathead is one of a number of small to medium fish species with notably flat heads, distributed in membership across various genera of the family Platycephalidae. Many species are found in the Indo-Pacific, especially most parts of Australia where they are popular sport and table fish. They inhabit estuaries and the open ocean. Flathead can grow at least 1m in length and 18 kilograms in weight, with dusky flathead being the biggest, although fish this size are seldom caught.

Anatomy and morphology
Flathead are notable for their unusual body shape, which their hunting strategy is based upon.  Flathead are dorsally compressed, meaning their body is wide but flattened and very low in height.  Both eyes are on the top of the flattened head, giving excellent binocular vision to attack overhead prey.  The effect is somewhat similar to flounders.  In contrast to flounder, however, flathead are much more elongated, the tail remains vertical, and the mouth is large, wide and symmetrical.  Flathead use this body structure to hide in sand (their body colour changes to match their background), with only their eyes visible, and explode upwards and outwards to engulf small fish and prawns as they drift over, using a combination of ram and suction feeding thereby improving their chances to catch prey. 

Flathead have two short spikes on either side of their heads and on top of their heads that contain venom. The venom, while not fatal, can cause pain and infection for no more than about 2 days. Some anglers believe the pain of the sting of the Flathead fish can be reduced by rubbing the slime of the belly of the same fish that caused the sting on the inflicted wound, due to a particular gland in its belly.

Habitat
Dusky Flatheads are found in estuaries and coastal bays from Cairns in Queensland to the Gippsland Lakes in Victoria. They occur over sand, mud, gravel and seagrass and can inhabit estuarine waters up to the tidal limit.

Oceanic flathead species (sand flathead, tiger flathead, bar-tailed flathead) are, as named, generally located more offshore than the dusky flathead, frequenting the sandy zones around and between coastal reefs; although bar-tailed flathead occur in many estuarine environments, for example the Swan/Canning River System in Perth.

Importance to humans

Fishermen catch flathead on a variety of baits and artificial lures all year round, but they are more commonly caught during summer.  Only a handful of the many flathead species are regularly caught by fishermen. Flathead species found in higher latitude areas are more welcome at the table. The best tasting fish are found in Port Phillip Bay in Victoria, Australia. The Australian state of New South Wales has a substantial commercial flathead catch.

See also
Platycephalus

Notes

-The biggest to be caught on record is 2.8 meters, just shy of 3 meters by Willem Powerfish of QLD, Australia

External links
 
 Photos of several species of Crocodilefishes

Platycephalidae
Fish of Australia
Fish common names